Jacek Gabrusewicz (born February 10, 1982) is a Polish footballer who currently plays for OKS 1945 Olsztyn.

Career

Club
In the summer 2008, he joined Dolcan Ząbki.

In January 2011, he returned to OKS 1945 Olsztyn.

References

External links
 

1982 births
Living people
Polish footballers
OKS Stomil Olsztyn players
Ząbkovia Ząbki players
Place of birth missing (living people)
Association football defenders